The 2008 Honda Indy 200 at Mid-Ohio presented by Westfield Insurance was the twelfth round of the 2008 IndyCar Series season. It took place on 20 July 2008.

Race results

Honda 200
Indy 200 at Mid-Ohio
Honda 200
Honda 200